Brehna is a town and a former municipality in the district of Anhalt-Bitterfeld, in Saxony-Anhalt, Germany. Since 1 July 2009, it is part of the town Sandersdorf-Brehna.

It is situated southwest of Bitterfeld. Important in this city is the church
where Katharina von Bora, the wife of Martin Luther lived.

Former municipalities in Saxony-Anhalt
Sandersdorf-Brehna